Leo Francis Matthew Cullen (born 9 January 1978) is an Irish rugby coach and former professional rugby union player. He played at lock for Leinster Rugby and Ireland. He was appointed coach of Leinster rugby on 19 August 2015.

Early life and education
Cullen was educated firstly at Willow Park which is the junior school to Blackrock College where he attended secondary school. He then studied Agricultural Science at University College Dublin. He graduated in 1999 with a BA in Economics.

Cullen won a Leinster Schools Senior Cup medal in 1995 as well as 1996, when Blackrock beat a Newbridge College team which included Geordan Murphy.

Playing career

Club playing career
Cullen began his career with Leinster by representing them at schoolboy level in 1995 before moving on to their U20 team where he won seven caps. He also made five appearances on the 'A' team and finally debuted during the interprovincial and Heineken Cup matches of the 1998/99 season.

Cullen moved to Leicester Tigers in 2005 where he made 56 appearances, 15 as captain.  He was a part of the squad that won the EDF Energy Cup and Guinness Premiership in 2007. He was also on the losing side in the 2007 Heineken Cup Final, when London Wasps defeated Leicester at Twickenham Stadium.

Cullen re-joined Leinster in 2007 and was part of the squad that won the 2007/2008 Celtic League. On 26 August 2008, he was named as Leinster captain following Brian O'Driscoll stepping down from the role meaning he has captained most of the teams he has played on.  He led Leinster to success in their first ever Heineken Cup in 2009, beating Leicester in the final. He also captained Leinster in 2011 to another Heineken Cup victory, and in 2012 became the first person to captain a team to three Heineken Cup victories. He retired in May 2014 after winning the 2014 Pro12 Grand Final.

International playing career
Cullen has represented his country at all levels, 7 caps at schools level, then captaining the U19 team 3 times in 4 caps.  He went on to captain the U21s 14 times in 16 appearances. He also appeared for the U25 team and was capped 16 times at 'A' level Irish Wolfhounds where he captained the team against England.

Cullen made his senior debut against the All Blacks in Auckland in 2002. He became the 100th man to captain Ireland, against Scotland on 6 August 2011.

Coaching career
After retiring from playing in 2014, Cullen remained at Leinster as a forwards coach. He became head coach in 2015.

His coaching colleague, Stuart Lancaster, has described Cullen's strengths as "very high integrity... very good leadership qualities... unbelievable work ethic... very good on the managerial side of things." He is also regarded as effective in bringing out the strengths of coaching colleagues.

Cullen became the first person to win the top European Rugby trophy as a player and a coach, when his Leinster side defeating Racing 92 in the Champions Cup final in May 2018, having already won it three times as a player.

Honours
Leinster
European Rugby Champions Cup: 3 (2009, 2011, 2012)
European Challenge Cup: 1 (2013)
United Rugby Championship: 4 (2002, 2008, 2013, 2014)

Leicester
Premiership Rugby: 1 (2007)
Anglo-Welsh Cup: 1 (2007)

Leinster (as coach)
European Rugby Champions Cup: 1 (2018)
United Rugby Championship: 4 (2018, 2019, 2020, 2021)
Irish Shield 1 (2022)

Individual
URC Coach of the Year: 2 (2018, 2022)
URC Chairman's Award: 1 (2014)
URC Team of the Year: 2 (2008, 2010)

UCD 

 UCD Alumni Award in Sport 2021

References

External links
Leinster profile

1978 births
Living people
Irish rugby union coaches
Irish rugby union players
Ireland international rugby union players
Leinster Rugby players
Leinster Rugby non-playing staff
Alumni of University College Dublin
University College Dublin R.F.C. players
Blackrock College RFC players
Leicester Tigers players
People educated at Blackrock College
Ireland Wolfhounds international rugby union players
Rugby union locks
Rugby union players from County Wicklow
Irish expatriate rugby union players
Irish expatriate sportspeople in England
Expatriate rugby union players in England